The 1991 PCzechoslovak  Open was a men's tennis tournament played on Clay in Prague, Czech Republic that was part of the International Series of the 1991 ATP Tour.
Jordi Arrese was the defending champion, but lost in the second round to Thomas Muster.

Karel Nováček won the title by defeating Magnus Gustafsson 7–6(7–5), 6–2 in the final.

Seeds

Draw

Finals

Top half

Bottom half

References

External links
 Official results archive (ATP)
 Official results archive (ITF)

Prague Open (1987–1999)
1991 ATP Tour